Wilmette Public Schools District 39 (D39) is a school district headquartered in the Mikaelian Education Center in Wilmette, Illinois in the Chicago metropolitan area. The boundaries of the school district include most of Wilmette, a small part of southeastern Glenview, with a population of  27,247 as of 2019, and a neighborhood in unincorporated Cook County with Winnetka addresses.

Schools
Wilmette Junior High School (Grades 7–8)
Highcrest Middle School  (Grades 5–6)
Elementary schools (Grades K-4):
Romona Elementary
Central Elementary
McKenzie Elementary
Harper Elementary

As of April 2020, the Illinois State Board of Education maintained a summative designation of "Exemplary" for Romona Elementary and Central Elementary, which indicates performance in the top ten percent of schools statewide with no under-performing student groups. 

Students in this district are zoned to New Trier High School in Winnetka, Illinois.

References

External links
 

School districts in Cook County, Illinois
Wilmette, Illinois